Zurich Instruments Ltd. is a privately owned company developing and selling advanced test and measurement instruments equipped with software for dynamic signal analysis. The company is based in Technopark, Zurich, Switzerland, and has international subsidiaries operating in Shanghai and Boston. Its focus is on academic and industrial research and development organizations.

History 
Zurich Instruments was founded in April 2008 as a spin-off by three employees of the Swiss Federal Institute of Technology (ETH Zurich). hoping to take advantage of market demand for better lock-in amplifiers. 

Seed financing was gained from startup competition prizes and a research project for ETH Zurich. Since then, Zurich Instruments' growth has been self-financed.

The company's first product, the HF2LI, a 50 MHz lock-in amplifier, was introduced in 2009. By 2015 two further lock-in amplifiers, the UHFLI and MFLI, had been introduced, covering the frequency ranges from DC to 600 MHz and DC to 500 kHz/5 MHz respectively.

Since 2016 Zurich Instruments has also been developing quantum computing instrumentation technology in close collaboration with the groups of Prof. Andreas Wallraff at ETH Zurich and Prof. Leo DiCarlo at Delft University of Technology. In 2018, Zurich Instruments commercialized the first Quantum Computing Control System (QCCS), which integrates a multi-channel Arbitrary Waveform Generator (HDAWG), a Quantum Analyzer (UHFQA) and a Programmable Quantum System Controller (PQSC). 

Zurich Instruments products include impedance analyzers, phase-locked loops, digitizers and boxcar averagers. All products utilize the instrument control software LabOne, which provides platform-independent instrument control through a web-based user interface as well as a variety of APIs.

In June 2021, Zurich Instruments was wholly acquired by Rohde & Schwarz

Main applications 

Optics & Photonics
Scanning Probe Microscopy
Quantum Computing & Sensing
 Nanophysics
Sensors & Actuators
Engineering & Semiconductors
Bioengineering & Med-technology
Electrochemistry

References

External links 

Application notes from Zurich Instruments
Principles of lock-in detection and the state of the art, White Paper, 2016, from Zurich Instruments

Companies based in Zürich
Electronic test equipment manufacturers
Swiss brands